The 2011 Chinese Taipei Open Grand Prix Gold was the tenth grand prix gold and grand prix badminton tournament of the 2011 BWF Grand Prix Gold and Grand Prix. The tournament was held in Hsing Chuang Gymnasium, Taipei, Taiwan from 3 to 8 September 2013 and had a total purse of $200,000.

Men's singles

Seeds

  Nguyen Tien Minh
  Park Sung Hwan
  Lee Hyun Il
  Hu Yun
  Simon Santoso
  Tommy Sugiarto
  Wong Wing Ki
  Dionysius Hayom Rumbaka
  Son Wan Ho
  Ajay Jayaram
  Alamsyah Yunus
  Chan Yan Kit
  Dicky Palyama
  Hsu Jen Hao
  Tanongsak Saensomboonsuk
  Anand Pawar

Finals

Top half

Section 1

Section 2

Section 3

Section 4

Bottom half

Section 5

Section 6

Section 7

Section 8

Women's singles

Seeds

  Cheng Shao-chieh
  Bae Youn-joo
  Ratchanok Intanon
  Sung Ji-hyun
  Yip Pui Yin
  Tai Tzu-ying
  Juan Gu
  Lindaweni Fanetri

Finals

Top half

Section 1

Section 2

Bottom half

Section 3

Section 4

Men's doubles

Seeds

  Jung Jae Sung / Lee Yong-dae
  Ko Sung Hyun / Yoo Yeon-seong
  Markis Kido / Hendra Setiawan 
  Alvent Yulianto Chandra / Hendra Aprida Gunawan 
  Fang Chieh Min / Lee Sheng-mu 
  Cho Gun Woo / Kwon Yi Goo 
  Chen Hung-ling / Lin Yu-lang 
  Goh V Shem / Lim Khim Wah

Finals

Top half

Section 1

Section 2

References

Chinese Taipei Open
BWF Grand Prix Gold and Grand Prix
Chinese Taipei Open
Sport in Taipei